Bordin Phala (born 20 December 1994) is a Thai professional footballer who plays as a winger for Thai League 1 club Port FC  and the Thailand national team.

Club career

Port
Bordin Phala is a Port midfielder who has taken part in the vast majority of the side's Thai League 1 games in 2020 making 27 appearances overall and accumulating 1,796 minutes of playing time. He has started in 21 of these appearances across their 29 fixtures and been used as a substitute on six occasions.

International career
In 2021, he was called up by Alexandré Pölking to play for Thailand at the 2020 AFF Championship. He scored in the 1st leg final against Indonesia.

Career statistics

International

International goals
Scores and results list Thailand's goal tally first.

Honours

Clubs
Buriram United
 Thai League 1 (1): 2017

Port
 Thai FA Cup (1): 2019

Bangkok Glass
 Thai FA Cup (1): 2014

International
Thailand
 AFF Championship (2): 2020, 2022
 King's Cup (2): 2016, 2017

References

External links
Bordin Phala at Soccerway

1994 births
Living people
Bordin Phala
Bordin Phala
Association football midfielders
Bordin Phala
Bordin Phala
Bordin Phala
Bordin Phala
Bordin Phala
Bordin Phala
Bordin Phala